Uber Eats is an online food ordering and delivery platform launched by Uber in 2014. Meals are delivered by couriers using cars, scooters, bikes, or on foot. It is operational in over 6,000 cities across 45 countries as of 2021. 

The process of delivering food is still carried out by Uber drivers, who often only need a few minutes to finish a single service. In places where UberEats is offered, Uber will collaborate with multiple restaurants every day to serve meals to its passengers. The company is facing a lawsuit for antitrust price manipulation, from forcing restaurants to charge the same price for delivery as for dine-in if the restaurant wants to be listed on UberEats' app, along with charging fees of 13–40% of revenue.

History 

Uber Eats' parent company Uber was founded in 2009 by Garrett Camp and Travis Kalanick. The company began food delivery in August 2014 with the launch of the UberFRESH service in Santa Monica, California. In 2015, the platform was renamed to UberEATS and the ordering software was released as its own application, separate from the app for Uber rides. In 2016, it commenced operations in both London and Paris.

In August 2018, Uber Eats changed its flat $4.99 delivery fee to a rate that is determined by distances. The fee ranges from a $2 minimum to an $8 maximum. In the UK and Ireland, the delivery fee is based on the value of the order. In February 2019, Uber Eats announced that it would reduce its fee from 35 percent of the order's value to 30 percent. As part of its expansion into foreign markets, the company announced its intention to open virtual restaurants in the UK. Sometimes called cloud restaurants or cloud kitchens, these are restaurant kitchens staffed to prepare and deliver food, either for existing brick-and-mortar restaurants wishing to move their delivery operations offsite, or for delivery-only restaurants with no walk-in or dining room service.

In November 2018, the company announced plans to triple its workforce in its European markets. As of November 2018, the company reported making food deliveries in 200 cities in 20 countries in EMEA markets.

In 2019, Uber Eats said it would deliver food to customers by drones from the Northern Hemisphere summer of 2019, and partnered with Apple on the release of the Apple Card. In July, Uber Eats began offering a dine-in option in certain cities that allowed customers to order food ahead of time and then eat in the restaurant.

In September 2019, Uber Eats said it would leave the South Korea market, with Reuters attributing this to the amount of competition for food delivery companies in Korea. In October, the company launched a pick-up option. On October 15, 2019, the company said it would deliver Burger King fast food throughout the United States.

On January 21, 2020, Zomato said it would acquire all of Uber Eats's stock in India. As part of the deal, Uber would own 10% stake in Zomato and Zomato would gain all the users of Uber Eats in India. At the time of the deal, Zomato was valued at roughly $3.55 billion.

On January 28, 2020 it was reported that Uber Eats no longer had exclusive delivery rights for McDonald's in the United Kingdom, as the fast food company had partnered with British-based food-delivery company Just Eat. The company had already lost its exclusive delivery rights with McDonald's in the United States the year before.

In March 2020, during the COVID-19 pandemic, Uber Eats saw a 30% rise in new customers, as people avoided social interaction for fear of contracting the virus.

On May 4, 2020 Uber Eats announced they were exiting the United Arab Emirates and that the service would now be through Dubai based vehicle for hire company Careem. The same report stated they were also exiting Saudi Arabia and Egypt.  Uber bolstered its position in July 2020 with the acquisition of Postmates for $2.65 billion.

In December 2021, Uber Eats completed its first food delivery in space when it partnered with Japanese billionaire Yusaku Maezawa to send food to the International Space Station.

On March 11, 2022, Uber Eats added a fuel surcharge to deliveries in the United States and Canada. The new surcharge will be different depending on the delivery length and gas prices in each state.

During the COVID-19 pandemic, Uber Eats has been criticized for charging fast-food restaurants 30% to 35% commission.

In April 2022, Uber Eats partnered with the U.K.'s largest grocer, Tesco, to start in 20 stores and to guarantee delivery of an order within one hour.

On May 16, 2022, Uber Eats launched two autonomous delivery pilots in Los Angeles with Serve Robotics and Motional.

In December 2022, Uber Eats has partnered with Cartken, a self-driving 6-wheeled sidewalk bot, in Miami. The delivery system, originally from Oakland, CA, is set to deliver food and groceries to residents in Miami.  Consumers will be alerted when their food has arrived and they will go and retrieve their goods. Cartken and Uber Eats have not yet released how many bots will be in service, nor where they are headed next.

Allegations of monopolistic behavior 
In April 2020, a group of New Yorkers sued Uber Eats along with DoorDash, GrubHub, Postmates, accusing them of using their market power monopolistically by only listing restaurants on their apps if the restaurant owners signed contracts which include clauses that require prices be the same for dine-in customers as for customers receiving delivery. The plaintiffs state that this arrangement increases the cost for dine-in customers, as they are required to subsidize the cost of delivery; and that the apps charge “exorbitant” fees, which range from 13% to 40% of revenue, while the average restaurant's profit ranges from 3% to 9% of revenue. The lawsuit seeks triple damages, including for overcharges, since April 14, 2016 for dine-in and delivery customers in the United States at restaurants using the defendants’ delivery apps. The case is filed in the federal U.S. District Court, Southern District of New York as Davitashvili v GrubHub Inc., 20-cv-3000. Although a number of preliminary documents in the case have now been filed, a trial date has not yet been set.

Finances

See also
 Timeline of Uber

References

External links
 

Eats
Online food ordering
Privately held companies of the United States
American companies established in 2014
Retail companies established in 2014
Transport companies established in 2014
Internet properties established in 2014
Companies based in San Francisco